Emmie Takomana Chanika (26 May 1956 – 29 July 2022) was a Malawian human rights activist.

History
A trained registered nurse, Chanika began working in 1992 as human rights groups started to form and agitate for political change in Malawi which at the time suffered under the dictatorship of Hastings Kamuzu Banda. Emmie Chanika then founded the Civil Liberties Committee (CILIC), which was established in February 1992 as the first human rights organisation in Malawi. Emmie Chanika has been its executive director ever since. Under the banner of CILIC Emmie Chanika has been actively involved in the 1993 Referendum and the 1994 general election Civic Education which led to major democratic change and the end of Hastings Kamuzu Banda's dictatorship in Malawi. Although a trained registered nurse, Emmie Chanika continued to educate herself and among other qualifications obtained her Master of Science degree in Strategic Planning in 2007.

In 1995 the first democratic President of Malawi, Bakili Muluzi appointed Chanika to sit on the Mwanza Murders Commission, where former State President Hastings Kamuzu Banda, his right-hand man John Tembo, and confidante Ms. Cecelia Kadzamira were accused of masterminding the assassination of three cabinet ministers and a member of parliament.

In the years that followed, Emmie Chanika has been a fierce fighter for women and children's rights in a country where male domination is the norm. In the face of intimidation, threats and even physical violence she has been a voice for the oppressed women and children. Many women and children in distress have found their way to the CILIC offices in Blantyre and have received counselling, legal aid and professional advice.  Besides promoting democratic values and addressing politically motivated violence Emmie Chanika has also been a pioneer of prison reform in Malawi.

In May 2003, she joined other women's rights activists in denouncing Malawi President Bakili Muluzi's habit of publicly making sexist comments against women. "It is sad to note the president insults women in the presence of his wife, the clergy and leaders of the Muslim society," said Chanika.

Emmie Chanika continued to be one of the most courageous and influential human rights activists in Malawi and has also been one of the founding members of the human rights consultative forum HRCC. In the 2011 political crisis in Malawi which saw many Malawians taking to the street in anger with president Bingu Wa Mutharika's oppressive policies Emmie Chanika has taken a moderate stance. She has been calling for calm and for dialogue rather than confrontation.  This stance has prompted accusations that she is now on the payroll of the Malawi government. Nevertheless, these accusations appear unfounded as Emmie Chanika has continued to be vocal in her criticism of the Malawi government. Emmie Chanika disclosed in a recent interview that her organisation CILIC has almost folded because since HIVOS stopped funding CILIC in 2008 it has not received any support from international donors.  It appears that CILIC has also been undermined by the government and new civil society organisations who compete for access to donor funds. In spite of lack of funding Emmie Chanika was still an active human rights activist and has recently spoken out strongly on the issue of unscrupulous clergy and traditional religious experts labelling children, the handicapped and the elderly as witches.

Besides having authored and co-authored numerous documents and research reports, Emmie Chanika authored a book on Violence against Women and co-authored two books with medical historian and researcher, Dr. Adamson Sinjani Muula of the University of Malawi, College of Medicine. Their best seller is Malawi Lost Decade 1994–2004, all published by MontfortMedia, Balaka.

On 29 July 2022, Emmie Chanika died at the age of 66 after struggling with stroke.

References

External links
 Audio interviews with Emmie Chanika, from Voice of America
Child sexual assaults irk women activists, from NewsFromAfrica.org
CILIC information, from Research & Teaching, Human Rights, Gender Issues & Democracy in Southern Africa.

1956 births
2022 deaths 
Malawian human rights activists
Malawian women in politics